Chilgol Church is one of the two Protestant churches in North Korea and is located on Kwangbok Street, Kwangbok in Chilgol in west Pyongyang. It is dedicated to Kang Pan-sok, who was a Presbyterian deaconess and the mother of Kim Il-sung.

History
The church was founded in 1899. It was attended by Kang Pan-sok, the mother of Kim Il-sung who sometimes accompanied her there.

According to North Korea, the church was destroyed in June 1950 in the beginning of the Korean War by an American bombing and Kim Il-sung ordered the church to be rebuilt on the spot where the original one associated with his mother had stood. The church was rebuilt in its original style in 1989, and placed under the authority of the Korean Christian Federation.

There is a museum devoted to Kang near the church.

Worship
The church welcomes believers on official visits, foreign travelers to Pyongyang, diplomats, and members of international organizations. Morale, patriotism and national unity are celebrated there and prayers are addressed to the reunification of the country.

The congregation is about 150 persons. North Korean defectors from outside Pyongyang have reported that they were not aware of the existence of the church. The church is under lay leadership. Protestant pastors are present in the church, but it is not known if they are resident or visiting pastors.

The church is characterized as Protestant, but a denomination is not specified.

Politics
South Korean missionaries consider the church to be an instrument of state propaganda. South Korean pastor Han Sang-ryeol visited the church on 28 June 2010. His travel to North Korea was not authorized by the government of his home country and he was sentenced to five years in prison upon his return to South Korea.

See also

Chilgol Station
Bongsu Church
Changchung Cathedral
Religion in North Korea

References

Works cited

External links

1899 establishments in Korea
Churches in North Korea
Buildings and structures in Pyongyang
Churches completed in 1899
Churches completed in 1989